Volleyball events were contested at the 1978 Central American and Caribbean Games in Medellín, Colombia.

References
 

1978 Central American and Caribbean Games
1978
1978 in volleyball
International volleyball competitions hosted by Colombia